Jordan Mines is an unincorporated community in Alleghany County, Virginia, United States. It is located approximately 11 miles south of Covington and just south of nearby unincorporated Boiling Spring. It is commonly known as the former site of a large iron ore mine and associated town which was in operation until the 1920s, explaining the origin of its name.

References
GNIS reference

Unincorporated communities in Virginia
Unincorporated communities in Alleghany County, Virginia